The Wonder Man is a 1920 American silent drama film directed by  John G. Adolfi and starring Georges Carpentier.

Cast
 Georges Carpentier as Henri D'Alour
 Faire Binney as Dorothy Stoner
 Florence Billings as Mrs. Stoner
 Downing Clarke as Mr. Stoner
 Cecil Owen as Mr. Robbins
 Robert Barrat as Alan Gardner
 William Halligan as Bubbles
 Pat Hartigan as Monroe
 John Burkell as Butler

See also

References

External links

1920 films
Films directed by John G. Adolfi
American silent feature films
American black-and-white films
Silent American drama films
1920 drama films
Film Booking Offices of America films
1920s American films
Silent adventure films